Ruffle is an emulator for SWF files. Ruffle is freely licensed and developed openly on GitHub.

Following the deprecation and disabling of Adobe Flash Player, some websites adopted Ruffle so users could continue to view and interact with legacy Flash content.

Features 
Ruffle is written in the Rust programming language, featuring a desktop client and a web client. Website authors can load Ruffle using JavaScript or users can install a browser extension that works on any website.

The web client relies on Rust being compiled to WebAssembly, which allows it to run inside a sandbox, a significant improvement compared to Flash Player, which had a multitude of security issues. The Rust language itself prevents against common memory safety issues that Flash Player suffered from, such as use after free or buffer overflows.

The desktop client uses a command-line interface to open SWF files, with a full graphical user interface planned for the future. Downloads are available for Windows, macOS and Linux.

As of March 2023, Ruffle primarily supports older Flash content while also supporting some AS3 contents, which use ActionScript 1.0 and 2.0 with 95% of the language and 73% of the API implemented. ActionScript 3.0 support is at 60% of the language and 52% of the API. Bleeping Computer reported that all the SWF games they tried in February 2021 "worked flawlessly."

History

Background 
Adobe announced in 2017 that it would stop supporting Flash Player on January 1, 2021, encouraging the use of HTML5 instead. That same year The New York Times began working on archiving old web content so readers could view webpages as they were originally published, and now uses Ruffle for old Flash content.

Adobe started blocking the use of Flash Player on January 12, 2021 using a kill switch. Various websites, including governmental and educational ones, were not prepared for the shutoff and stopped working.

Ruffle 
Mike Welsh, who worked at Newgrounds until 2012, previously worked on an open source project named Swivel to archive Flash content into videos.

In 2016, Welsh began a project called Fluster. Later renamed Ruffle, this project would morph into a Flash Player emulator written in Rust, with a desktop and web client.

Websites using Ruffle 
Between 2019 and 2020, some websites announced they would be using Ruffle.

Newgrounds founder Tom Fulp said they realized "the end of Flash was coming" in 2010, but did not know when. In 2019, Newgrounds announced it was sponsoring the development of Ruffle, and would use it for all Flash content, starting with animations and later interactive games. The switch allowed Newgrounds to offer some touch-friendly games on mobile for the first time. Founder Tom Fulp told The Washington Post: "We've been integrating Ruffle with the site and so far, the majority of content [on Newgrounds] from before 2007 is running with Ruffle."

In 2020, Coolmath Games announced that that they would be using technologies such as Ruffle to make Flash content playable. 

In November 2020, Internet Archive announced they will be using Ruffle to preserve Flash games and animations. Jason Scott, an archivist at the Internet Archive, said: "I looked into adding it to the Internet Archive system, and it took less than a day and a half because it was so well made."

In December 2020, Armor Games announced that Ruffle had been chosen as their player for Flash content.

Homestar Runner has also announced the implementation of Ruffle for their cartoons and games. Though certain elements of the website itself are currently unsupported by the emulator, most of the site's content has shifted to containment within a Ruffle window at the very least. Aside from the official website, this change was also soft announced via Strong Bad's Twitter account.

See also 
 Haxe
 Mozilla Shumway
 Lightspark

References

External links 
 
 
 

Adobe Flash
Free software programmed in Rust
Free emulation software